Lendenfeld Peak, in the past also Mount Lendenfeld, is the eighth highest named summit in New Zealand and in Aoraki / Mount Cook National Park.

The summit is named after the Austrian zoologist and mountaineer Robert J. Lendlmayer von Lendenfeld. It is on the northeast ridge of Mount Tasman, separated from it by the Engineer Col (3093 m). It is normally climbed from the New Zealand Alpine Club hut on the Fox Glacier. The normal route from the Marcel Col over the east ridge is a relatively easy ascent in good conditions. The best time to climb this mountain is between September and March.

See also
 List of mountains of New Zealand by height

References

 Sources
 
 

Lendenfeld
Lend
Lend